The family Pseudopomyzidae comprises minute to small (1.7-5.5 mm), dark-coloured acalyptrate flies; formerly they have been treated as a subfamily of Cypselosomatidae

Biology
The biology of pseudopomyzines is very poorly known. Most species are from the New World and Asia. There is only one European species, Pseudopomyza atrimana (Meigen, 1830), which occurs in woodland, and adults have been found to gathering over rotting logs or attracted to the freshly cut and sappy stumps or logs of deciduous trees.

Genera
Latheticomyia Wheeler, 1956
Heloclusia Malloch, 1933
Macalpinella Papp, 2005
Polypathomyia Krivosheina, 1979
Pseudopomyza Strobl, 1893
Pseudopomyzella Hennig, 1969
Rhinopomyzella Hennig, 1969
Tenuia Malloch, 1926

Fossils
The fossil record is very poor, with only one specimen of the species, Eopseudopomyza kuehni Hennig, 1971, which has been recorded from Baltic amber.

References

External links

Diptera.info Images of Pseudopomyza atrimana
Checklist of Diptera of the Czech Republic and Slovakia
UK Pseudopomyzinae on the Dipterists Forum

 
Brachycera families